Le-Aufa'amulia Asenati Lole-Taylor (born  ) is a former New Zealand politician and a member of the House of Representatives. She is a member of the New Zealand First Party.

Early life
Born in Samoa, Taylor emigrated to New Zealand at the age of 17. She has served as chairperson of the Auckland City Pacific Islands Board and as a member of the Pacific Health Advisory Committee of the Auckland District Health Board. Prior to election to Parliament, Taylor worked as the Regional Advisor Pacific Northern Region for Rehabilitation and Reintegration Services at the Department of Corrections. 
She has three children and one stepson.

Political career

Taylor was a member of the New Zealand Labour Party and stood in the Tamaki-Maungakiekie Ward in the 2007 Auckland City Council elections.

Taylor stood for New Zealand First in the Maungakiekie electorate in the 2008 election, but was unsuccessful.

She became the New Zealand First candidate for the Manukau East electorate in the 2011 election. She was elected from the party list due to her list ranking of eighth. After being demoted to the sixteenth position on the New Zealand First party list, Lole-Taylor failed to return to Parliament at the 2014 general election.

In 2013, Taylor voted against the Marriage Amendment Bill, which aims to permit same sex marriage in New Zealand, with all of her fellow New Zealand First MPs.

After Parliament

Following her demotion and subsequent failure to get re-elect Taylor has kept a low profile. Taylor came to prominence when it was found both she and her husband, Dennis Taylor, had illicitly accessed private data during their time working for the Department of Corrections. The access was found to be in regards to an elected official of the New Zealand First Party.  Records pertaining to drink driving offences committed by Marise Bishop, a former director on NZ First's board and Mana electorate chairwoman, were accessed from Corrections'.  She [Marise] believed Mr Taylor's motivation was down to his wife's loyalty to fellow Samoan NZ First member Tim Manu who was active in the Mana electorate but with whom Ms Bishop had fallen out with. 
Following the release of this information Taylor hinted she was contemplating a move to Australia and removed most of her Social Media presence, having been known for outspoken tweets during her time as an MP
In May 2015 Taylor left New Zealand despite a probe into the activities of her and her husband and were believed to have left New Zealand in March.

References

1960s births
Living people
New Zealand First MPs
New Zealand list MPs
Women members of the New Zealand House of Representatives
New Zealand Labour Party politicians
Members of the New Zealand House of Representatives
Unsuccessful candidates in the 2008 New Zealand general election
Unsuccessful candidates in the 2014 New Zealand general election
21st-century New Zealand politicians
21st-century New Zealand women politicians